Shelagh McCall KC is a Scottish lawyer.

She worked for the International Criminal Tribunal for the Former Yugoslavia in The Hague.

She appeared for the defence alongside Gordon Jackson KC in HM Advocate v Salmond.

References

Scottish King's Counsel
Living people
Year of birth missing (living people)
Place of birth missing (living people)
Scottish women lawyers